Lisa Drouillard (born March 10, 1992, in Brooklyn, New York) is a Haitian-American beauty queen who was crowned Miss Haiti 2015 and competed at the Miss Universe 2015 pageant in the US.

Personal life
Lisa is currently studying at John Jay College of Criminal Justice. She went to high school at St. Joseph's High School in the United States and was crowned Miss New York Teen USA 2011. In 2011 she competed at the Miss Teen USA 2011 pageant in Nassau, the Bahamas. In 2014, she placed in the Top 10 at the Miss Grand International 2014 pageant in Bangkok, Thailand.

Miss Haiti 2015
On November 8, 2015, Lisa Drouillard won the title of Miss Haiti Universe 2015. She is the 13th Miss Haiti winner since the title's beginning in 1960. The pageant was held through a casting call by Megali Felbes, the Miss Haiti Universe National Director. The nine finalists then competed for the title of Miss Haiti Universe 2015 in Port-au-Prince. As Miss Haiti Universe, she competed at the Miss Universe 2015 pageant.

References

External links
Miss Haiti Universe official fan page

1992 births
Living people
Haitian female models
Haitian beauty pageant winners
2011 beauty pageant contestants
21st-century Miss Teen USA delegates
Miss Universe 2015 contestants
People from Brooklyn